Alessio Briglia (born 22 December 1988) is an Italian footballer who plays as a midfielder for Serie A team Cesena.

Career
Briglia started his career at Hellas Verona F.C. and was a member of its Primavera youth team in 2006–07 season. His contract was not renewed on 30 June 2007 and he joined Bellaria – Igea Marina in free transfer.

After the end of 2010–11 Lega Pro Seconda Divisione he joined Serie A team Cesena and joined the pre-season camp.

References

External links
 Football.it Profile 
 

Italian footballers
Hellas Verona F.C. players
A.C. Bellaria Igea Marina players
F.C. Canavese players
A.C. Cesena players
Association football midfielders
1988 births
Living people